Center Township is one of 37 townships in Washington County, Arkansas, USA. At the 2010 census, its total population was 1,518.

Center Township was established in 1880.

Geography
Center Township was created in 1880 from parts of Prairie and Marrs Hill Townships. It has three disconnected sections.

Cities, towns, villages
Appleby
Starks
Walnut Grove

Cemeteries
The township contains one cemetery, Cemetery Hill.

Major routes
 U.S. Route 62
 Arkansas Highway 170

References

 United States Census Bureau 2008 TIGER/Line Shapefiles
 United States National Atlas

External links
 US-Counties.com
 City-Data.com

Townships in Washington County, Arkansas
Populated places established in 1880
1880 establishments in Arkansas
Townships in Arkansas